Christougenna Me Tin Katy (Greek: Χριστούγεννα Με Την Καίτη; English: Christmas With Katy) is the ninth studio album by Greek artist, Katy Garbi. It was released on 12 November 1998 by Sony Music Greece and certified gold in four Christmas seasons, but until today gained platinum certification, selling over 50,000 units, and it is the only Greek Christmas album that has achieved gold and platinum certification. The original album contains eleven Greek versions of well-known international Christmas songs, accompanied by Spiros Labrou's children choir and internationally known tenor, Konstantinos Paliatsaras on the song "Touli Gia Ton Christouli". The choir had already collaborated with Katy in the song "Ftou Xeleftheria" from the album Arhizo Polemo (1996). Well-known lyricist, Eleni Giannatsoulia provided the Greek lyrics for all the songs on the album.

Background

Spiros Labrou, a well-known children's choir leader, introduced Katy to many foreign Christmas songs which were until then unknown to her. Labrou and Doulamis selected the songs that were to be translated for the album. Travelling to Australia as part of her world tour in 1998, Katy listened to the original version of the songs selected by her producer and Labrou. While found the songs to be difficult, she "fell in-love" with various Christmas songs, particularly those by Frank Sinatra such as Adeste Fideles which became the main single of the album.

Release

It was released in 1998 in Greece and Cyprus by Columbia Records, sublabel of Sony Music Greece. The original album, with Antonis Glikos at art direction and Tasos Vrettos at principal photography with red cover, where Katy holding a bunch of white Christmas lights. The album was reissued later with an alternate artwork, featuring Katy in a snow globe on a white background.

In 2007, Sony BMG Greece granted a licensed re-release to Athens-based Espresso newspaper for their Chrisi Diskothiki; the re-release contained the same tracks as the original. The photo used for the 2007 re-release was taken from the album Apla Ta Pragmata (2001).

In 2021, Panik Platinum, sublabel of Panik Records Greece, had acquired the rights to Sony Music and re-released the album with a new song "Chronia Polla", adapted by Carol Of The Bells. The cover of the 12-track release contains a Nutcracker cartoon version of Katy, which stems from Katy's line of Garbi-themed smartphone pictograms titled "Kaitoji".

Track listing

Singles
"Touli Gia Ton Christouli"

"Touli Gia Ton Christouli" was the lead single alongside the release of the album in November 1998 and is the most successful album's song. The single was accompanied by a music video which featured Katy alongside internationally known tenor, Konstantinos Paliatsaras and Spiros Labrou's children choir on a snow-filled mountain. Directed by Giorgos Gkavalos and his production company View Studio, the music video was filmed on the Hymettus in Athens, featuring artificial snow created by snow machines.

"Mega Christmas Special"

A television special dedicated to Christougenna Me Tin Katy produced and directed by Giorgos Gkavalos and View Studio, premiered on Mega Channel. The special features the music video for "Touli Gia Ton Christouli" and nine full-length video clips of Katy singing to the remaining songs from the album, except the song "Christougenna Xana". The video clips were filmed in various locations around Athens, including a busy street in Syntagma Square around the city's large Christmas tree and in a snow-covered field. The transition between songs was filled by a child giving a Christmas wish. While "Touli Gia Ton Christouli" is predominantly screened as a stand-alone clip on television music channels, the remaining clips are only screened as part of a complete television special.

Credits
Credits adapted from liner notes.

Personnel

 Maria Barbadimou – children choir
 Tzortzina Broutzi – children choir
 Maria Daphnomili – children choir
 Michalis Diakogiorgis – percussion
 Popi Drosou – children choir
 Sofia Favrou – children choir
 Elena Fragkouli – children choir
 Vasilis Gkinos – music adaption, orchestration, programming, keyboards
 Stelios Goulielmos – backing vocals
 Antonis Gounaris – guitars
 Anna Ioannidou – backing vocals
 Ioanna Kallioupi – children choir
 Anna Kappa – children choir
 Kelly Karamesini – children choir
 Sofia Kardatou – children choir
 Efi Kefala – children choir
 Kostas Kefalas – children choir
 Maria Kostala – children choir
 Giorgos Kostoglou – bass
 Annalia Kouloktsi – children choir
 Antonis Koulouris – drums
 Elena Labrou – children choir
 Sofia Labrou – children choir
 Magda Makri – children choir
 Konstantinos Paliatsaras – vocals (tracks: 1)
 Thimios Papadopoulos – flute
 Aggeliki Papoutsi – children choir
 Melina Pasari – children choir
 Fotini Radeou – children choir
 Giouli Sontaki – children choir
 Eleni Spetsioti – children choir
 Natasa Varela – children choir
 Ioanna Zervolea – children choir

Production

 Giannis Doulamis – production manager
 Al Giga – styling
 Antonis Glikos – art direction
 Giannis Ioannidis (Digital Press Hellas) – mastering
 Iakovos Kalaitzakis – make up
 Michalis Kloukinas – editing
 Vaggelis Lappas (Sierra studio) – sound engineer
 Panagiotis Petronikolos (Sierra studio) – sound engineer, mix engineer
 Petros Siakavellas (Digital Press Hellas) – mastering
 Katerina Sideridou – cover processing
 Stefanos Vasilakis – hair styling
 Tasos Vrettos – photographer

Charts 
Christougenna Me Tin Katy debuted at number 4 on IFPI Greek Album Charts spending 10 weeks on the charts over the Christmas holiday season into 1998. The album re-entered the IFPI Greek Album Charts multiple times over consecutive Christmas seasons between 1999 and 2002, and reaching number 5 in 2019. The album gained gold status in December 2002 for the shipment of 30,000 units, making it the only Greek Christmas album to be certified gold. The 2021 re-release of the album debuted at number 5 on the 'IFPI Top 75 Combined Album Charts'.

Original release

2013 reissue

2021 reissue

Release history

References 

Katy Garbi albums
Sony Music Greece albums
1998 Christmas albums
Christmas albums by Greek artists
Folk Christmas albums
Greek-language albums